Albert Siklós (born Albert Schönwald: 26 June 1878 in Budapest – 3 April 1942 in Budapest) was a Hungarian composer.

Siklós studied at Budapest's music academy under Hans von Koessler. From 1918 on he taught composition, aesthetic and choir singing at the academy; in 1928 he became a ministerialis commissioner at the conservatory.

He composed two operas and a pantomime, two symphonies and a symphony for twelve double basses, four orchestral suites, two cello concertos, a piano concerto and one violin concerto. On the side, he penned a Hungarian music lexicon and a musical treatise.

References

External links
 

1878 births
1942 deaths
Hungarian classical composers
Hungarian male classical composers
Hungarian opera composers
Male opera composers